The 1993 IAAF World Cross Country Championships was held in
Amorebieta, Spain, at the Jaureguibarría Course on March 28, 1993.
A report on the event was given in The New York Times and in the Herald.

Complete results for senior men, junior men, senior women, junior women, medallists, 
 and the results of British athletes were published.

Medallists

Race results

Senior men's race (11.75 km)

Note: Athletes in parentheses did not score for the team result

Junior men's race (7.15 km)

Note: Athletes in parentheses did not score for the team result

Senior women's race (6.35 km)

Note: Athletes in parentheses did not score for the team result

Junior women's race (4.45 km)

Note: Athletes in parentheses did not score for the team result

Medal table (unofficial)

Note: Totals include both individual and team medals, with medals in the team competition counting as one medal.

Participation
An unofficial count yields the participation of 653 athletes from 54 countries.  This is in agreement with the official numbers as published.

 (1)
 (14)
 (15)
 (3)
 (22)
 (6)
 (19)
 (2)
 (27)
 (1)
 (4)
 (3)
 (11)
 (13)
 (2)
 (26)
 (6)
 (10)
 (27)
 (11)
 (2)
 (15)
 (1)
 (18)
 (19)
 (2)
 (26)
 (24)
 (10)
 (25)
 (15)
 (3)
 (10)
 (17)
 (15)
 (8)
 (5)
 (6)
 (21)
 (10)
 (20)
 (2)
 (26)
 (27)
 (5)
 (14)
 (6)
 (4)
 (27)
 (27)
 (8)
 (1)
 (4)
 (7)

See also
 1993 IAAF World Cross Country Championships – Senior men's race
 1993 IAAF World Cross Country Championships – Junior men's race
 1993 IAAF World Cross Country Championships – Senior women's race
 1993 IAAF World Cross Country Championships – Junior women's race
 1993 in athletics (track and field)

References

External links
The World Cross Country Championships 1973-2005
GBRathletics

 
World Athletics Cross Country Championships
Ath
Cross Country Championships
International athletics competitions hosted by Spain
Cross country running in Spain